The 2020–21 San Antonio Spurs season was the 54th season of the franchise, its 45th in the National Basketball Association (NBA), and its 48th in the San Antonio area. After a one-year absence from postseason play, the Spurs finished as the number ten seed with a 33-39 record, qualifying for the Page–McIntyre system tournament to determine the final two teams that advance to the main playoff bracket in the elimination bracket.  The Spurs were defeated in the elimination round by the Memphis Grizzlies 96–100, ending their season. It was the first time in franchise history that the Spurs failed to reach the playoffs in consecutive seasons.

Draft

Roster

Standings

Division

Conference

Game log

Preseason

|-style="background:#fcc;"
| 1
| December 12
| Oklahoma City
| 
| Patty Mills (24)
| Jakob Pöltl (9)
| Jakob Pöltl (10)
| AT&T Center
| 0–1
|-style="background:#fcc;"
| 2
| December 15
| @ Houston
| 
| Lonnie Walker (17)
| Trey Lyles (9)
| Dejounte Murray (7)
| Toyota Center
| 0–2
|-style="background:#fcc;"
| 3
| December 17
| @ Houston
| 
| DeMar DeRozan (21)
| Dejounte Murray (10)
| Dejounte Murray (4)
| Toyota Center
| 0–3

Regular season

|-style="background:#cfc;"
| 1
| December 23
| @ Memphis
| 
| DeMar DeRozan (28)
| DeMar DeRozan (9)
| DeRozan, Murray (9)
| FedExForum0
| 1–0
|-style="background:#cfc;"
| 2
| December 26
| Toronto
| 
| DeMar DeRozan (27)
| Dejounte Murray (10)
| Dejounte Murray (10)
| AT&T Center0
| 2–0
|-style="background:#fcc;"
| 3
| December 27
| @ New Orleans
| 
| Rudy Gay (22)
| Keldon Johnson (11)
| DeMar DeRozan (9)
| Smoothie King Center0
| 2–1
|-style="background:#fcc;"
| 4
| December 30
| L. A. Lakers
| 
| Dejounte Murray (29)
| Murray, Pöltl (7)
| Dejounte Murray (7)
| AT&T Center0
| 2–2

|-style="background:#fcc;"
| 5
| January 1
| L. A. Lakers
| 
| Keldon Johnson (26)
| Keldon Johnson (10)
| DeMar DeRozan (9)
| AT&T Center0
| 2–3
|-style="background:#fcc;"
| 6
| January 3
| Utah
| 
| Keldon Johnson (22)
| Trey Lyles (9)
| Dejounte Murray (5)
| AT&T Center0
| 2–4
|-style="background:#cfc;"
| 7
| January 5
| @ L. A. Clippers
| 
| Patty Mills (27)
| Keldon Johnson (11)
| DeMar DeRozan (6)
| Staples Center0
| 3–4
|-style="background:#cfc;"
| 8
| January 7
| @ L. A. Lakers
| 
| LaMarcus Aldridge (28)
| Dejounte Murray (8)
| DeMar DeRozan (8)
| Staples Center0
| 4–4
|-style="background:#cfc;"
| 9
| January 9
| @ Minnesota
| 
| DeMar DeRozan (38)
| Dejounte Murray (14)
| DeMar DeRozan (5)
| Target Center0
| 5–4
|-style="background:#fcc;"
| 10
| January 10
| @ Minnesota
| 
| Lonnie Walker IV (25)
| Trey Lyles (7)
| Dejounte Murray (5)
| Target Center0
| 5–5
|-style="background:#cfc;"
| 11
| January 12
| @ Oklahoma City
| 
| Lonnie Walker IV (24)
| LaMarcus Aldridge (10)
| Dejounte Murray (7)
| Chesapeake Energy Arena0
| 6–5
|-style="background:#fcc;"
| 12
| January 14
| Houston
| 
| Keldon Johnson (29)
| Dejounte Murray (8)
| DeRozan, Murray (7)
| AT&T Center0
| 6–6
|-style="background:#cfc;"
| 13
| January 16
| Houston
| 
| DeMar DeRozan (24)
| Dejounte Murray (10)
| DeMar DeRozan (4)
| AT&T Center0
| 7–6
|-style="background:#cfc;"
| 14
| January 18
| @ Portland
| 
| LaMarcus Aldridge (22)
| Dejounte Murray (9)
| DeRozan, Murray (11)
| Moda Center0
| 8–6
|-style="background:#fcc;"
| 15
| January 20
| @ Golden State
| 
| Dejounte Murray (22)
| Keldon Johnson (8)
| Johnson, DeRozan, Murray, Mills, Gay (3)
| Chase Center0
| 8–7
|-style="background:#fcc;"
| 16
| January 22
| Dallas
| 
| DeMar DeRozan (26)
| Keldon Johnson (14)
| DeMar DeRozan (6)
| AT&T Center0
| 8–8
|-style="background:#cfc;"
| 17
| January 24
| Washington
| 
| Patty Mills (21)
| Dejounte Murray (11)
| Dejounte Murray (10)
| AT&T Center0
| 9–8
|-style="background:#ccc;"
| –
| January 25
| @ New Orleans
| colspan="6" | Postponed (COVID-19) (Makeup date: April 24)
|-style="background:#cfc;"
| 18
| January 27
| Boston
| 
| DeMar DeRozan (21)
| Dejounte Murray (11)
| DeMar DeRozan (7)
| AT&T Center0
| 10–8
|-style="background:#cfc;"
| 19
| January 29
| Denver
| 
| DeMar DeRozan (30)
| Keldon Johnson (9)
| DeMar DeRozan (10)
| AT&T Center0
| 11–8
|-style="background:#fcc;"
| 20
| January 30
| Memphis
| 
| Derrick White (18)
| Jakob Pöltl (7)
| Dejounte Murray (7)
| AT&T Center0
| 11–9

|-style="background:#fcc;"
| 21
| February 1
| Memphis
| 
| Keldon Johnson (25)
| Keldon Johnson (10)
| DeMar DeRozan (6)
| AT&T Center0
| 11–10
|-style="background:#cfc;"
| 22
| February 3
| Minnesota
| 
| DeMar DeRozan (30)
| Dejounte Murray (11)
| Derrick White (8)
| AT&T Center0
| 12–10
|-style="background:#cfc;"
| 23
| February 6
| @ Houston
| 
| DeMar DeRozan (30)
| Jakob Pöltl (11)
| DeMar DeRozan (7)
| AT&T Center0
| 13–10
|-style="background:#cfc;"
| 24
| February 8
| Golden State
| 
| Dejounte Murray (27)
| Jakob Pöltl (11)
| DeMar DeRozan (10)
| AT&T Center0
| 14–10
|-style="background:#fcc;"
| 25
| February 9
| Golden State
| 
| Rudy Gay (17)
| Gay, Johnson, Vassell (6)
| DeRozan, Johnson (6)
| AT&T Center0
| 14–11
|-style="background:#cfc;"
| 26
| February 12
| @ Atlanta
| 
| DeMar DeRozan (23)
| Jakob Pöltl (12)
| DeMar DeRozan (8)
| State Farm Arena1,451
| 15–11
|-style="background:#cfc;"
| 27
| February 14
| @ Charlotte
| 
| Dejounte Murray (26)
| Dejounte Murray (12)
| DeMar DeRozan (9)
| Spectrum Center0
| 16–11
|-style="background:#ccc;"
| — 
| February 16
| @ Detroit
| colspan="6" | Postponed (COVID-19) (Makeup date: March 15)
|-style="background:#ccc;"
| — 
| February 17
| @ Cleveland
| colspan="6" | Postponed (COVID-19) (Makeup date: March 19)
|-style="background:#ccc;"
| — 
| February 20
| @ New York
| colspan="6" | Postponed (COVID-19) (Makeup date: May 13)
|-style="background:#ccc;"
| — 
| February 22
| @ Indiana
| colspan="6" | Postponed (COVID-19) (Makeup date: April 19)
|-style="background:#fcc;"
| 28
| February 24
| @ Oklahoma City
| 
| Dejounte Murray (27)
| Dejounte Murray (9)
| Murray, Pöltl (9)
| Chesapeake Energy Arena0
| 16–12
|-style="background:#cfc;"
| 29
| February 27
| New Orleans
| 
| DeMar DeRozan (32)
| Jakob Pöltl (11)
| DeMar DeRozan (11)
| AT&T Center0
| 17–12

|-style="background:#fcc;"
| 30
| March 1
| Brooklyn
| 
| DeMar DeRozan (22)
| Jakob Pöltl (12)
| DeMar DeRozan (11)
| AT&T Center0
| 17–13
|-style="background:#cfc;"
| 31
| March 2
| New York
| 
| Trey Lyles (18)
| Jakob Pöltl (8)
| DeMar DeRozan (11)
| AT&T Center0
| 18–13
|-style="background:#fcc;"
| 32
| March 4
| Oklahoma City
| 
| DeMar DeRozan (20)
| Trey Lyles (10)
| Dejounte Murray (10)
| AT&T Center1,000
| 18–14
|-style="background:#fcc;"
| 33
| March 10
| @ Dallas
| 
| DeMar DeRozan (30)
| Rudy Gay (9)
| DeMar DeRozan (11)
| American Airlines Center3,813
| 18–15
|-style="background:#cfc;"
| 34
| March 12
| Orlando
| 
| Rudy Gay (19)
| Jakob Pöltl (9)
| Murray, Pöltl (6)
| AT&T Center3,241
| 19–15
|-style="background:#fcc;"
| 35
| March 14
| @ Philadelphia
| 
| Eubanks, White (17)
| Dejounte Murray (6)
| Derrick White (4)
| Wells Fargo Center3,071
| 19–16
|-style="background:#cfc;" 
| 36
| March 15
| @ Detroit
| 
| Dejounte Murray (19)
| Jakob Pöltl (12)
| Dejounte Murray (6)
| Little Caesars Arena0
| 20–16
|-style="background:#cfc;"
| 37
| March 17
| @ Chicago
| 
| Jakob Pöltl (20)
| Jakob Pöltl (16)
| Derrick White (5)
| United Center0
| 21–16
|-style="background:#cfc;"
| 38
| March 19
| @ Cleveland
| 
| Keldon Johnson (23)
| Keldon Johnson (21)
| DeMar DeRozan (7)
| Rocket Mortgage FieldHouse0
| 22–16
|-style="background:#fcc;"
| 39
| March 20
| @ Milwaukee
| 
| Lonnie Walker IV (31)
| Keldon Johnson (8)
| DeMar DeRozan (13)
| Fiserv Forum3,280
| 22–17
|-style="background:#fcc;"
| 40
| March 22
| Charlotte
| 
| DeMar DeRozan (28)
| Jakob Pöltl (11)
| DeMar DeRozan (5)
| AT&T Center3,222
| 22–18
|-style="background:#fcc;"
| 41
| March 24
| L. A. Clippers
| 
| DeMar DeRozan (19)
| Drew Eubanks (8)
| Dejounte Murray (5)
| AT&T Center3,224
| 22–19
|-style="background:#fcc;"
| 42
| March 25
| L. A. Clippers
| 
| DeMar DeRozan (23)
| Johnson, Pöltl (8)
| Dejounte Murray (7)
| AT&T Center3,225
| 22–20
|-style="background:#cfc;"
| 43
| March 27
| Chicago
| 
| Jakob Pöltl (20)
| Jakob Pöltl (9)
| DeRozan, White (7)
| AT&T Center3,334
| 23–20
|-style="background:#fcc;"
| 44
| March 29
| Sacramento
| 
| Dejounte Murray (23)
| Jakob Pöltl (11)
| Dejounte Murray (8)
| AT&T Center2,876
| 23–21
|-style="background:#cfc;"
| 45
| March 31
| Sacramento
| 
| DeMar DeRozan (26)
| Jakob Pöltl (14)
| DeMar DeRozan (7)
| AT&T Center2,802
| 24–21

|-style="background:#fcc;"
| 46
| April 1
| Atlanta
| 
| DeMar DeRozan (36)
| Jakob Pöltl (10)
| DeMar DeRozan (9)
| AT&T Center2,949
| 24–22
|-style="background:#fcc;"
| 47
| April 3
| Indiana
| 
| DeMar DeRozan (25)
| Jakob Pöltl (13)
| DeMar DeRozan (6)
| AT&T Center3,276
| 24–23
|-style="background:#fcc;"
| 48
| April 5
| Cleveland
| 
| DeMar DeRozan (20)
| Keldon Johnson (10)
| Derrick White (8)
| AT&T Center2,482
| 24–24
|-style="background:#fcc;"
| 49
| April 7
| @ Denver
| 
| Murray, White (18)
| Rudy Gay (8)
| Dejounte Murray (6)
| Ball Arena3,715
| 24–25
|-style="background:#fcc;"
| 50
| April 9
| @ Denver
| 
| Derrick White (25)
| Jakob Pöltl (10)
| DeMar DeRozan (12)
| Ball Arena3,750
| 24–26
|-style="background:#cfc;"
| 51
| April 11
| @ Dallas
| 
| DeMar DeRozan (33)
| Jakob Pöltl (8)
| DeMar DeRozan (8)
| American Airlines Center4,054
| 25–26
|-style="background:#cfc;"
| 52
| April 12
| @ Orlando
| 
| DeMar DeRozan (19)
| Keldon Johnson (11)
| DeRozan, Murray (6)
| Amway Center3,107
| 26–26
|-style="background:#fcc;"
| 53
| April 14
| @ Toronto
| 
| Derrick White (25)
| Jakob Pöltl (10)
| DeMar DeRozan (11)
| Amalie Arena1,184
| 26–27
|-style="background:#fcc;"
| 54
| April 16
| Portland
| 
| DeMar DeRozan (26)
| Johnson, Murray (13)
| DeRozan, Murray (10)
| AT&T Center4,303
| 26–28
|-style="background:#cfc;"
| 55
| April 17
| @ Phoenix
| 
| Rudy Gay (19)
| Drew Eubanks (13)
| Derrick White (6)
| Phoenix Suns Arena5,078
| 27–28
|-style="background:#cfc;"
| 56
| April 19
| @ Indiana
| 
| Derrick White (25)
| Drew Eubanks (13)
| Dejounte Murray (7)
| Bankers Life Fieldhouse0
| 28–28
|-style="background:#fcc;"
| 57
| April 21
| Miami
| 
| DeMar DeRozan (15)
| Jakob Poeltl (9)
| Derrick White (7)
| AT&T Center4,229
| 28–29
|-style="background:#cfc;"
| 58
| April 22
| @ Detroit
| 
| Derrick White (26)
| Jakob Poeltl (11)
| Derrick White (8)
| Little Caesars Arena3,334
| 29–29
|-style="background:#cfc;"
| 59
| April 24
| @ New Orleans
| 
| DeMar DeRozan (32)
| Keldon Johnson (9)
| DeMar DeRozan (8)
| Smoothie King Center3,700
| 30–29
|-style="background:#cfc;"
| 60
| April 26
| @ Washington
| 
| DeMar DeRozan (37)
| Dejounte Murray (17)
| DeMar DeRozan (10)
| Capital One Arena2,133
| 31–29
|-style="background:#fcc;"
| 61
| April 28
| @ Miami
| 
| Dejounte Murray (22)
| Dejounte Murray (10)
| Dejounte Murray (11)
| American Airlines ArenaLimited seating
| 31–30
|-style="background:#fcc;"
| 62
| April 30
| @ Boston
| 
| DeMar DeRozan (30)
| Jakob Pöltl (10)
| DeMar DeRozan (14)
| TD Garden2,298
| 31–31

|-style="background:#fcc;"
| 63
| May 2
| Philadelphia
| 
| Lonnie Walker IV (23)
| Rudy Gay (10)
| Keldon Johnson (5)
| AT&T Center3,978
| 31–32
|-style="background:#fcc;"
| 64
| May 3
| @ Utah
| 
| DeMar DeRozan (22)
| Rudy Gay (7)
| DeMar DeRozan (6)
| Vivint Arena6,506
| 31–33
|-style="background:#fcc;"
| 65
| May 5
| @ Utah
| 
| Luka Šamanić (15)
| Drew Eubanks (9)
| Lonnie Walker IV (5)
| Vivint Arena6,506
| 31–34
|-style="background:#cfc;"
| 66
| May 7
| @ Sacramento
| 
| DeMar DeRozan (25)
| Jakob Pöltl (10)
| Dejounte Murray (7)
| Golden 1 Center0
| 32–34
|-style="background:#fcc;"
| 67
| May 8
| @ Portland
| 
| DeMar DeRozan (20)
| Lonnie Walker IV (8)
| Dejounte Murray (5)
| Moda Center1,939
| 32–35
|-style="background:#cfc;"
| 68
| May 10
| Milwaukee
| 
| DeMar DeRozan (23)
| Jakob Pöltl (10)
| Dejounte Murray (9)
| AT&T Center3,992
| 33–35
|-style="background:#fcc;"
| 69
| May 12
| @ Brooklyn
| 
| DeMar DeRozan (21)
| Dejounte Murray (11)
| DeRozan, Murray (5)
| Barclays Center1,773
| 33–36
|-style="background:#fcc;"
| 70
| May 13
| @ New York
| 
| DeMar DeRozan (27)
| Murray, Pöltl (9)
| Dejounte Murray (7)
| Madison Square Garden1,981
| 33–37
|-style="background:#fcc;"
| 71
| May 15
| Phoenix
| 
| Dieng, Johnson (18)
| Drew Eubanks (11)
| Jones, Mills, Walker IV (5)
| AT&T Center4,848
| 33–38
|-style="background:#fcc;"
| 72
| May 16
| Phoenix
| 
| DeMar DeRozan (23)
| Jakob Poeltl (10)
| Tre Jones (7)
| AT&T Center4,738
| 33–39

Play-in 

|-style="background:#fcc;"
| 1
| May 19
| @ Memphis
| 
| DeRozan, Gay (20)
| Dejounte Murray (13)
| Dejounte Murray (11)
| FedExForum7,019
| 0–1

Transactions

Trades

Free agency

Re-signed

Additions

Subtractions

References

San Antonio Spurs seasons
San Antonio Spurs
San Antonio Spurs
San Antonio Spurs